Minhla may refer to various places in Burma:

 Minhla, Bago, small town
 Minhla Township, whose seat is Minhla Bago
 Minhla, Magway, town
 Minhla Township, Magway, whose seat is Minhla, Magway
 Minhla, Mon, village 
 Minhla, Sagaing, village